Capitol High School is a public high school named after the Louisiana State Capitol in Baton Rouge, Louisiana.

History
Capitol Junior - Senior High School opened in 1950 as the second public secondary school for African Americans in the city. In 1959, the high school and middle school split, and the middle school remained in the original building. The Capitol Senior High School building was constructed in 1960. 

The state took control of the Capitol High in 2008, citing low performance. Capitol High School became part of the RSD-Capitol Education Foundation. A plan to make it a KIPP school for the 2022-2023 school year fell through. Local control as part of the East Baton Rouge Parish School System will return during the 2023-2024 school year. 

Capitol High's student body was 98.2 percent African American in 2021. Most students are "economically disadvantaged" and the school's test scores are very low.

School newspaper
The Leader newspaper is the school newspaper.

Athletics
Capitol High athletics competes in the LHSAA. Lions are the school mascot and the school colors are red and gold.

Championships
(1) ​L.I.A.L.O. Football State Championship: 1955

Football 
In 2022, Johnathan Brantley was announced as head football coach.

Notable people
Seimone Augustus, WNBA basketball player
Brandon Bass, NBA basketball player
Terrance Broadway, football player
Oliver Lafayette, NBA basketball player

Further reading
Red and Gold Forever; A History of Capitol High School, 1950-2000 by Summer Lynn Davis, University of South Carolina (2013)

References

External links
School website

Schools in Baton Rouge, Louisiana
Public high schools in Louisiana